The following is a list of players, both past and current, who appeared at least in one game for the St. John's Edge National Basketball League of Canada (NBLC) franchise.


B

C

E

F

G

H

J

K

L

M

N

R

S

W

External links 
St. John's Edge players

St. John's Edge